WFMD (930 AM) is a news/talk/sports-formatted broadcast radio station licensed to Frederick, Maryland, serving the Frederick/Hagerstown area. WFMD is owned and operated by Connoisseur Media.

Sale
WFMD, along with its sister station WFRE, were put into a trust by owner Clear Channel Communications with the intention to sell the stations in August 2008.

On March 27, 2019, Connoisseur Media announced that it would acquire WFMD and sister station WFRE from the Aloha Station Trust in exchange for transferring its Erie, Pennsylvania cluster to iHeartMedia. The sale closed on May 20, 2019.

References

External links
 Free Talk 930 WFMD Online

FMD
Frederick County, Maryland
Connoisseur Media radio stations